Auca coctei is a butterfly of the family Nymphalidae. It is found in Chile and Argentina.

The larvae feed on various species of bunch grass.

References

Butterflies described in 1838
Satyrini
Nymphalidae of South America